N-ERGIE is an energy company with headquarters in Nuremberg.

Electric power companies of Germany
Companies based in Nuremberg